Uzky Lug is a rural locality (a selo) in Bichursky District, Republic of Buryatia, Russia. The population was 482 as of 2010. There are 7 streets.

Geography 
Uzky Lug is located 41 km northeast of Bichura (the district's administrative centre) by road. Buy is the nearest rural locality.

References 

Rural localities in Bichursky District